Laetitia Bégué (born 30 September 1980 in Monaco) is a Franco-Monegasque artistic gymnast who won the French Gymnastics Championships in 1994.

References

Living people
1980 births
French female artistic gymnasts